César Ricardo de Lucena (born 6 July 1980), known as César Lucena or simply César, is a Brazilian football manager and former player who played as a central defender. He is the current assistant manager of Sport Recife.

Playing career
Born in Guarulhos, Lucena began his senior career with hometown side Flamengo-SP. In 2002, he moved to Portuguesa and also spent a short period at Portuguesa Santista.

In June 2005, Lucena joined Guarani from Marília, where he featured regularly. In 2006, he moved abroad for the first time in his career, joining Asteras Tripolis in the Football League Greece.

Lucena returned to Brazil in December 2006, after agreeing to a contract with Sport Recife. He left the club in the end of the following year after failing to agree new terms, and subsequently joined Figueirense; on 29 February 2008, however, he returned to Sport.

Lucena quickly established himself as a starter for the Leão, lifting the 2008 Copa do Brasil and three Campeonato Pernambucano titles in a row. He left the club in 2012, after struggling with injuries.

On 11 July 2012, after two months training to regain match fitness, Lucena signed a contract with Sport's rivals Santa Cruz. After failing to establish himself as a starter, he moved to América Mineiro on 1 April 2013.

Lucena left Coelho in the end of 2014, and subsequently represented clubs in the Rio Grande do Sul: Novo Hamburgo in 2015, and Aimoré in 2016.

Managerial career
In April 2018, Lucena returned to Sport to work as one of Nelsinho Baptista's assistants. He remained at the club even after Nelsinho was fired, and was named interim manager in February 2019, after Milton Cruz was dismissed; however, he was not in charge of the first team in any matches, as Guto Ferreira was hired.

In August 2019, Lucena was named manager of Sport's under-20 squad. He became an assistant of the main squad for the 2020 campaign, and in February 2020, after Ferreira was sacked, Lucena was named interim manager of the main squad. After the appointment of Daniel Paulista as manager, he returned to his previous role.

Honours
Sport
Campeonato Pernambucano: 2007, 2008, 2009, 2010
Copa do Brasil: 2008

Figueirense
Campeonato Catarinense: 2008

References

External links
 
 

1980 births
Living people
People from Guarulhos
Brazilian footballers
Association football defenders
Campeonato Brasileiro Série A players
Campeonato Brasileiro Série B players
Associação Atlética Flamengo players
Associação Portuguesa de Desportos players
Associação Atlética Portuguesa (Santos) players
Marília Atlético Clube players
Guarani FC players
Sport Club do Recife players
Figueirense FC players
Santa Cruz Futebol Clube players
América Futebol Clube (MG) players
Esporte Clube Novo Hamburgo players
Clube Esportivo Aimoré players
Football League (Greece) players
Asteras Tripolis F.C. players
Brazilian football managers
Campeonato Brasileiro Série B managers
Sport Club do Recife managers
Brazilian expatriate footballers
Brazilian expatriate sportspeople in Greece
Expatriate footballers in Greece
Footballers from São Paulo (state)